Eublemma pyrosticta is a species of moth of the  family Erebidae. It is endemic in Réunion, where it is found in medium altitudes in the centre and North of the island.

Its basic colours are black with white; wingspan is approx. 17 mm.

References

Moths described in 1910
Boletobiinae
Endemic fauna of Réunion
Moths of Réunion